
Gmina Oława is a rural gmina (administrative district) in Oława County, Lower Silesian Voivodeship, in south-western Poland. Its seat is the town of Oława, although the town is not part of the territory of the gmina.

Neighbouring gminas
Gmina Oława is bordered by the town of Oława and the gminas of Czernica, Domaniów, Jelcz-Laskowice, Lubsza, Siechnice, Skarbimierz and Wiązów.

Villages
The gmina contains the villages of Bolechów, Bystrzyca, Chwalibożyce, Drzemlikowice, Gać, Gaj Oławski, Godzikowice, Godzinowice, Jaczkowice, Jakubowice, Janików, Jankowice, Jankowice Małe, Lizawice, Marcinkowice, Marszowice, Maszków, Miłonów, Niemil, Niwnik, Oleśnica Mała, Osiek, Owczary, Psary, Ścinawa, Ścinawa Polska, Siecieborowice, Siedlce, Sobocisko, Stanowice, Stary Górnik, Stary Otok and Zabardowice.

Twin towns – sister cities

Gmina Oława is twinned with:
 Pidhaitsi Raion, Ukraine
 Rudamina, Lithuania

References

Olawa
Oława County